Pearson  v  Aotea  District Maori Land Board [1945] NZGazLawRp 39; [1945] NZLR 542; (1945) 47 GLR 205 is a cited case in New Zealand regarding property law.

References

1945 in New Zealand
High Court of New Zealand cases
Property law